In Canada, a treaty Indian is an Indian who belongs to a band that is party to one of the eleven Numbered Treaties signed by Canada with various First Nations between 1871 and 1922. It contrasts with Indians whose bands are not party to a treaty (primarily in British Columbia) and with "non-status Indians", that is, people of Indian heritage who are not recognized legally as Indians.

See also
Treaty rights

References

First Nations
Aboriginal title in Canada
Numbered Treaties